Quilby Creek is a stream in the U.S. state of Alabama.

Quilby is a name derived from the Choctaw language purported to mean "creek where the panther was killed". Variant names are "Koilbah Creek", "Quibby Creek", and "Quillibee Creek".

References

Rivers of Alabama
Rivers of Sumter County, Alabama
Alabama placenames of Native American origin